Pere Tomàs (born 5 September 1989)  is a Spanish professional basketball player for Granada of the Liga ACB.

Professional career
Tomàs signed with ICL Manresa on August 5, 2016.

On August 9, 2022, he signed with Covirán Granada of the Spanish Liga ACB.

Euroleague career statistics

|-
| style="text-align:left;"| 2008–09
| style="text-align:left;"| Joventut
| 9 || 1 || 8.7 || .500 || .625 || .333 || 1.2 || .3 || .4 || .1 || 2.3 || 2.7
|-
|}

References

External links
Pere Tomàs at acb.com 
Euroleague.net Profile

1989 births
Living people
Bàsquet Manresa players
Basket Zaragoza players
Bilbao Basket players
CB Prat players
Fundación CB Granada players
Gipuzkoa Basket players
Joventut Badalona players
Liga ACB players
Small forwards
Spanish men's basketball players
Sportspeople from Mallorca